Yogesh Vijay Takawale (born 5 November 1984) is an Indian cricketer. He made his first-class debut in 2005-06 as a specialist batsman for Maharashtra.

In 2013–14 he captained Tripura in the Ranji Trophy and scored Tripura's highest first-class score of 212 against Hyderabad. He also plays for the IPL team Royal Challengers Bangalore.

References

External links 

Cricketers from Pune
Indian cricketers
Maharashtra cricketers
Mumbai Indians cricketers
Tripura cricketers
India Blue cricketers
1984 births
Living people
Royal Challengers Bangalore cricketers
People from Pune
Wicket-keepers

mr:भारतीय क्रिकेट संघ